The 2007–08 season was APOEL's 68th season in the Cypriot First Division and 80th year in existence as a football club.

The club won the championship the previous season so it played in the UEFA Champions League qualifiers.

Manager Marinos Ouzounidis left the club by mutual consent on 6 January 2008, due to the club's lower-than-expected performance in the Cypriot First Division and two days later he was replaced by Ivan Jovanović who managed to help the club to win the Cypriot Cup at the end of the season.

Squad
Last update: 16 April 2008

Squad changes

In:

Total expenditure:  €0

Out:

Total income:  €400K
{|

Club

Management

Kit

|
|
|

Other information

Competitions

Overall

Marfin Laiki League

Classification

Results summary

Results by round

Playoffs table
The first 12 teams are divided into 3 groups. Points are carried over from the first round.

Group A

Matches
All times for the Domestic Competitions at EET

Regular season

Playoffs

UEFA Champions League

First qualifying round

BATE won 3–2 on aggregate.

Cyprus FA Shield

Cypriot Cup

Fourth round

APOEL won 9–0 on aggregate.

Group B

Semi-finals

APOEL won 3–2 on aggregate.

Final

APOEL won the 2007–08 Cypriot Cup (19th title).

Notes

References

APOEL FC seasons
APOEL